Svetlana Todorova (born 19 October 1974) is a Bulgarian gymnast. She competed  at the 1992 Summer Olympics.

References

External links
 

1974 births
Living people
Bulgarian female artistic gymnasts
Olympic gymnasts of Bulgaria
Gymnasts at the 1992 Summer Olympics
People from Haskovo
Sportspeople from Haskovo Province